Joint Task Force Civil Support (JTF-CS) is a subordinate command of United States Northern Command headquartered at Fort Eustis.  Its mission is to provide command and control for Department of Defense forces deployed in support of the National Response Plan, specifically, managing the consequences of a domestic chemical, biological, radiological, nuclear, or high-yield explosive (CBRNE) incident. JTFCS consists of discrete units of specialized consequence management troops from all services called the DOD CBRN Response Forces (DCRF), as well as civilian subject matter experts, assigned from various agencies. JTF-CS is able to respond anywhere in North America within 12 hours to lead technical and non-technical search and rescue, security, hazard analysis, evidence collection, mission command, logistics support, aviation support, and medical support after an actual or threatened CBRNE incident. JTF-CS is also a collaborative partner in planning for and responding to identified National Special Security Events (NSSE) around the United States.

JTF-CS was created in 1999 to fulfill the Congressional mandate in the 1998 Nunn-Lugar-Domenici legislation  for the Secretary of Defense to develop and enhance the federal government's capability to prevent and respond to terrorist attacks.

The current commander of JTF-CS is Colonel Timothy J. Sulzner, Army National Guard.

List of commanders

References

External links
 www.jtfcs.northcom.mil—Joint Task Force Civil Support
 A Short History of U.S. Northern Command

Civil Support

de:United States Northern Command
fr:United States Northern Command
ja:アメリカ北方軍
no:U.S. Northern Command
sl:Severno poveljstvo ZDA
fi:USNORTHCOM